Alejandro Antonio Bernal Gutiérrez is a Chilean former professional footballer who played as a midfielder for clubs in Chile and Indonesia.

Club career
A product of Unión San Felipe youth system, Bernal made his debut in 1986, when the team was relegated to the Chilean Segunda División, alongside players such as Héctor Roco and Ricardo González, making seven appearances. He stayed with the team until the 1989 season, when they had returned to the Chilean Primera División and were again relegated to the second level.

In the Chilean Primera División, he also played for Universidad de Chile (1990), Unión Española (1991–94), Coquimbo Unido (1995) and Deportes Puerto Montt (1999).

In the second level of the Chilean football, he also played for O'Higgins (1997), becoming the top goalscorer of the team in the season, Deportes Linares (1998) and Deportes Ovalle (2000–01).

Abroad, he played for Indonesian club Persik Kediri in 2003–04, where he coincided with his compatriots Juan Carlos Tapia and Claudio Villan. As a member of Persik Kediri, he won the league title in 2003.

Honours
Persik Kediri
 Liga Indonesia Premier Division: 2003

References

External links
 
 Alejandro Bernal at playmakerstats.com (English version of ceroacero.es)
 

Living people
People from San Felipe, Chile
Chilean footballers
Chilean expatriate footballers
Unión San Felipe footballers
Universidad de Chile footballers
Unión Española footballers
Coquimbo Unido footballers
O'Higgins F.C. footballers
Deportes Linares footballers
Puerto Montt footballers
Deportes Ovalle footballers
Persik Kediri players
Primera B de Chile players
Chilean Primera División players
Indonesian Premier Division players
Chilean expatriate sportspeople in Indonesia
Expatriate footballers in Indonesia
Association football midfielders
Date of birth missing (living people)
Year of birth missing (living people)